Ghizer Tehsil is a tehsil, an administrative division of Ghizer District, an extreme western part of the Gilgit-Baltistan in Pakistan.

References 

Ghizer District
Tehsils of Gilgit-Baltistan